Lucas Prado (born 27 May 1985 in Mato Grosso) is a visually impaired Brazilian athlete. He lost 90% of his vision in 2003 due to retinal detachment. He was introduced to track by friend and Paralympian Terezinha Guilhermina.

He won three gold medals in track for Brazil at the 2008 Summer Paralympics, setting a world record, and won two silver medals running 100m and 400m during the London 2012 Paralympic Games.

References

External links 
 

1985 births
Living people
Sportspeople from Mato Grosso
Paralympic athletes of Brazil
Athletes (track and field) at the 2008 Summer Paralympics
Athletes (track and field) at the 2012 Summer Paralympics
Paralympic gold medalists for Brazil
Paralympic silver medalists for Brazil
World record holders in Paralympic athletics
Medalists at the 2008 Summer Paralympics
Medalists at the 2012 Summer Paralympics
Athletes (track and field) at the 2016 Summer Paralympics
Paralympic medalists in athletics (track and field)
Medalists at the 2007 Parapan American Games
Medalists at the 2011 Parapan American Games
Medalists at the 2015 Parapan American Games
Medalists at the 2019 Parapan American Games
Athletes (track and field) at the 2020 Summer Paralympics
Brazilian male sprinters
20th-century Brazilian people
21st-century Brazilian people